Advanced measurement approach (AMA) is one of three possible operational risk methods that can be used under Basel II by a bank or other financial institution.  The other two are the Basic Indicator Approach and the Standardised Approach.  The methods (or approaches) increase in sophistication and risk sensitivity with AMA being the most advanced of the three.

Under AMA the banks are allowed to develop their own empirical model to quantify required capital for operational risk. Banks can use this approach only subject to approval from their local regulators. Once a bank has been approved to adopt AMA, it cannot revert to a simpler approach without supervisory approval.

Also, according to section 664 of original Basel Accord, in order to qualify for use of the AMA a bank must satisfy its supervisor that, at a minimum:

Its board of directors and senior management, as appropriate, are actively involved in the oversight of the operational risk management framework;
It has an operational risk management system that is conceptually sound and is implemented with integrity; and
It has sufficient resources in the use of the approach in the major business lines as well as the control and audit areas.

The four data elements 
According to the BCBS Supervisory Guidelines, an AMA framework must include the use of four data elements: (i) Internal loss data (ILD), (ii) External data (ED), (iii) Scenario analysis (SBA), and (iv) Business environment and internal control factors (BEICFs).

Loss distribution approach 

While AMA does not specify the use of any particular modeling technique, one of the most common approaches taken in the banking industry is the loss distribution approach (LDA). With LDA, a bank first segments operational losses into homogeneous segments, called units of measure (UoMs). For each unit of measure, the bank then constructs a loss distribution that represents its expectation of total losses that can materialize in a one-year horizon. Given that data sufficiency is a major challenge for the industry, annual loss distribution cannot be built directly using annual loss figures. Instead, a bank will develop a  frequency distribution that describes the number of loss events in a given year, and a severity distribution that describes the loss amount of a single loss event. The frequency and severity distributions are assumed to be independent. The convolution of these two distributions then give rise to the (annual) loss distribution.

See also
Basel II
Basic indicator approach
Operational risk
Standardized approach (operational risk)

References

BIS publications
http://www.bis.org/publ/bcbsca.htm Basel II: Revised international capital framework (BCBS)
http://www.bis.org/publ/bcbs107.htm Basel II: International Convergence of Capital Measurement and Capital Standards: a Revised Framework (BCBS)
http://www.bis.org/publ/bcbs118.htm Basel II: International Convergence of Capital Measurement and Capital Standards: a Revised Framework (BCBS) (November 2005 Revision)
http://www.bis.org/publ/bcbs128.pdf Basel II: International Convergence of Capital Measurement and Capital Standards: a Revised Framework, Comprehensive Version (BCBS) (June 2006 Revision)
http://www.bis.org/publ/bcbs196.htm Operational Risk - Supervisory Guidelines for the Advanced Measurement Approaches - final document (BCBS) (June 2011 Revision)

Basel II
Capital requirement
Operational risk
Management cybernetics